Tylewice  is a village in the administrative district of Gmina Wschowa, within Wschowa County, Lubusz Voivodeship, in western Poland.

Notable residents
Walter von Unruh (1877–1956), German general

References

Tylewice